The Anglo-Soviet Treaty, formally the Twenty-Year Mutual Assistance Agreement Between the United Kingdom and the Union of Soviet Socialist Republics, established a military and political alliance between the Soviet Union and the British Empire.

Background 
The Treaty followed on from the Anglo-Soviet Agreement of July 1941 that they would assist each other in fighting Germany and not seek a separate peace.

The first meeting to discuss the treaty took place on 15 December 1941, a week after the United States had joined the British Empire and the Soviet Union to oppose the Axis powers.

One of the goals of Joseph Stalin, the Soviet Union's head of government, was to establish a territorial agreement for a postwar Europe that would be largely divided between Britain and the Soviet Union.

Stalin hoped to regain the territories that had been held by the Soviet Union, including Finland, Estonia, Latvia, Lithuania, Romania, Ukraine and Belarus before its losses during Operation Barbarossa, the German invasion of the Soviet Union, which began on 22 June 1941. In exchange, Britain would receive land and permission to have naval bases and maritime passage through the English Channel, the North Sea and the Baltic Sea. Britain made no commitments and Stalin's ideas did not form part of the agreement.

Agreement 
A military alliance was to last until the end of World War II, and a political alliance was to last 20 years. The treaty was signed in London on 26 May 1942 by British Foreign Secretary Anthony Eden and Soviet Foreign Minister Vyacheslav Molotov.

The treaty was bilateral. Absent from the discussions were the other Allies, including the United States, Canada, Australia, New Zealand, British India and the Republic of China. Also not represented were the Allies that had governments-in-exile, such as Czechoslovakia and France, whose countries were being occupied by Germany, despite the Soviets' initial aim being to direct those countries' postwar structure.

Significance
The treaty represented a transition for Britain, which sacrificed some of its superpower status because of its weakened military state but still exerted diplomatic power during the negotiations.

Despite the successful creation of the United Nations, the alliance of the Soviet Union with the United Kingdom, and the United States, ultimately broke down and evolved into the Cold War, which took place over the following half-century.

See also
Anglo-Soviet invasion of Iran
Anglo-Soviet relations
Diplomatic history of World War II
History of the United Nations
Percentages agreement

References

External links
 Text of the treaty
 Molotov's Report on Ratification of the Anglo-Soviet Treaty
 George Ciorănescu, "The Problem of Bessarabia and Northern Bucovina During World War II", Radio Free Europe, 12 May 1981.

Treaties concluded in 1942
Treaties entered into force in 1942
1942 in the Soviet Union
May 1942 events
Bilateral treaties of the United Kingdom
Soviet Union–United Kingdom relations
Politics of World War II
1942 in the United Kingdom
United Kingdom in World War II
Soviet Union in World War II
Military alliances involving the Soviet Union
Treaties of the Soviet Union
Anthony Eden